Drori is a surname that is usually Israeli in origin. Notable people with the surname include:

 Amir Drori, Israeli general
 Avraham Drori
 Hasya Drori
Nili Drori, Israeli Olympic fencer
 Ofir Drori, Israeli animal rights activist
 Ze'ev Drori
 Zephaniah Drori, Chief Rabbi of Kiryat Shmona and Rosh Yeshiva of Kiryat Shmona Hesder Yeshiva

See also 
 Sparrow (disambiguation)

Hebrew-language surnames